Innovative Emergency Management (IEM) is a Research Triangle Park, North Carolina-headquartered disaster management company founded in 1985. It is headed by CEO Madhu Beriwal.  IEM has eleven offices strategically located around the United States.  Their areas of specialty include homeland security and emergency management, information technology, defense support, and program integration support.

On June 3, 2004 IEM was contracted by the Department of Homeland Security/Federal Emergency Management Agency to support development of a catastrophic hurricane response plan for Southeast Louisiana, including the City of New Orleans. The goal of the Hurricane Pam exercise focused on how all levels of government would manage the effects of the simulated hurricane after landfall and evacuation had occurred. The contract award for this plan was approximately $500,000.

To develop the plan, IEM created a model of a simulated category 3 hurricane called Hurricane Pam and its associated consequences. Drafts of 15 action plans were produced during the course of the first exercise, along with associated action plans, checklists, and trigger points. Three additional "Hurricane Pam" workshops were conducted before Hurricane Katrina struck on August 29, 2005. The last exercise using Hurricane Pam was conducted on August 24, 2005, five days before Hurricane Katrina made landfall. Hurricane Pam was a series of exercises to develop a comprehensive emergency response plan and is intended to be a living document, continually improved through workshops and exercises.

According to Greg Palast, in his film Big Easy to Big Empty, IEM could not produce a copy of its hurricane evacuation plan for New Orleans a year after Hurricane Katrina hit. However, a review of IEM's contract for Hurricane Pam indicates that an evacuation plan for New Orleans was never supposed to be developed as part of the contract.

On December 14, 2009, Madhu Beriwal announced that IEM was moving its corporate headquarters to the Research Triangle Park area near Raleigh, North Carolina. The move will occur by the end of September in 2010.

In 2014, IEM was selected by the State of New York to take over their post-Hurricane Sandy disaster housing recovery program, New York Rising. This program was funded by the U.S. Department of Housing and Urban Development (HUD) Community Development Block Grant Disaster Recovery program (CDBG-DR) and was designed to repair, rebuild, and elevate New York residents’ homes that had been damaged by Hurricane Sandy and Tropical Storms Irene and Lee. IEM distributed nearly $1 billion to more than 11,000 New York homeowners to help them recover from Hurricane Sandy. IEM also provided Public Assistance and Hazard Mitigation Grant Program support to the State of New York after Hurricane Sandy.

References 

Risk management companies
Disaster management tools
Emergency management in the United States
Companies based in Baton Rouge, Louisiana
American companies established in 1985
Consulting firms established in 1985
1985 establishments in Louisiana
Preparations for Hurricane Katrina